Eleanor of Castile (1200—1244) was Queen of Aragon by her marriage to King James I of Aragon.

Queenship 

Eleanor was the daughter of Alfonso VIII of Castile and Eleanor of England. In 1221 at Ágreda, Eleanor married King James I of Aragon; she was nineteen and he was fourteen. The next six years of James's reign were full of rebellions on the part of the nobles. By the Peace of Alcalá of 31 March 1227, the nobles and the king came to terms. The couple had a son, Alfonso, who married Constance of Béarn. Eleanor's marriage to James was annulled in 1230, and the agreement prohibited her from remarrying. Their son, Alfonso, was declared legitimate, but he pre-deceased James.

Monastic life 
Eleanor became a nun after the annulment. She went to the Abbey of Santa María la Real de Las Huelgas to join her elder sister Berengaria who had retired from ruling Castile and Leon, and their other sister Constance, who was long a nun there.  All three sisters died there, Constance in 1243, Eleanor in 1244, and Berengaria in 1246.  All are buried in the Abbey.

Burial
Eleanor was buried in the Monastery of Las Huelgas in Burgos. Her remains were deposited in a tomb which is now located in the Nave of Santa Catarina of the Gospel, and lies between the tomb containing the remains of Philip, son of Sancho IV and María de Molina, which is placed to the right, and the tomb containing the remains of Peter, brother of Philip.

During work on the Monastery in the middle of the twentieth century it was found that the remains of Eleanor, mummified and in good condition, lay in her tomb of limestone; the roof had two slopes and was smooth, although in the past was polychrome. Her coffin was wooden and devoid of cover, although there were still remnants of its shell and lysed cross made of studded gold braid, as well as clothing that was buried with the Queen, among which highlighted three brocade garments in Arabic, which Manuel Gómez Moreno considered similar to those found in the grave of her grandnephew Philip.

References

Sources

|-

1244 deaths
Castilian House of Burgundy
Burials at the Abbey of Santa María la Real de Las Huelgas
Aragonese queen consorts
Countesses of Barcelona
13th-century Castilians
Castilian infantas
Consorts of Montpellier
Year of birth unknown
13th-century Spanish women
13th-century people from the Kingdom of Aragon
Daughters of kings